David John Hamer  (5 September 1923 – 14 January 2002) was an Australian politician and Royal Australian Navy officer.

Early life and naval career
Born in Melbourne, he was educated at Geelong Grammar School and then the Royal Australian Naval College. He served in the Royal Australian Navy from 1940 to 1968. He was a lieutenant aboard  during the battles of Leyte in October 1944 and Lingayen Gulf in January 1945.  During this time he served as the Australia'''s Air Defence Officer.

Then after serving as director of project coordination in Navy Office, he resigned from the RAN in 1968.

Political career
In 1969, David was elected to the Australian House of Representatives as the Liberal member for Isaacs. Narrowly defeated by Labor candidate Gareth Clayton in 1974, he became a political columnist for The Age newspaper and undertook a Master of Arts at Monash University in Constitutional Law, studying the historical role of the Australian Senate.  He was re-elected to Isaacs in 1975 but contested the Senate in 1977. He was successful, and remained a Liberal senator for Victoria until his retirement in 1990. A strong supporter of improving the function of the Senate as a house of review, he was Chairman of Committees as well as Deputy President of the Senate from 1983–1990.

Hamer was also interested in promoting the arts in Australia, helping establish the Arts Council of Victoria, and serving as President of the Arts Council of Australia and of the Australian Film Institute. He was a keen supporter of the establishment of the National Film and Sound Archive as a way to collect and make accessible Australia's rich audiovisual history.

Later life, family and legacy
Hamer died of leukaemia in 2002 (aged 78).

His publications include:    

 The Australian Senate 1901–1918, An Appraisal (1976);
 Can Responsible Government Survive In Australia? (1994); and
 Bombers Versus Battleships – The Struggle Between Ships and Aircraft for Control of the Surface of the Sea'' (1998) 

Hamer's brother was Sir Rupert Hamer (Dick Hamer), the Premier of Victoria 1972–81.  His brother Alan had been a Rhodes Scholar, chemist and businessman.  His sister Alison Patrick was an historian at Melbourne University. In 2004 the Hamer Family Fund was set up in honour of all four siblings and its aims include projects that advance the arts, the environment and good government in Australia.

References

Liberal Party of Australia members of the Parliament of Australia
Members of the Australian House of Representatives for Isaacs
Members of the Australian House of Representatives
Members of the Australian Senate for Victoria
Members of the Australian Senate
Members of the Order of Australia
Graduates of the Royal Australian Naval College
1923 births
2002 deaths
20th-century Australian politicians
People educated at Geelong Grammar School
Royal Australian Navy personnel of World War II
Royal Australian Navy officers
Politicians from Melbourne
Military personnel from Melbourne